Turinsk is a town and the administrative center of Turinsky District of Sverdlovsk Oblast, Russia, located on the right bank of the Tura River midway between Verkhoturye and Tyumen, near its confluence with the Yarlynka,  northeast of Yekaterinburg. Population:

History
It was founded in 1600 as an ostrog in place of the ancient town of Yepanchin, which was razed by Yermak Timofeyevich in 1581.

Climate

Notable people
Konstantin Podrevsky, Soviet Russian poet, co-author of "Dorogoi dlinnoyu"
Margarita Terekhova, Soviet Russian actress

References

Cities and towns in Sverdlovsk Oblast
Populated places established in 1600
Turinsky Uyezd